This is the complete list of number-one singles in Finland in 2018 according to the Official Finnish Charts. The list on the left side of the box (Suomen virallinen singlelista, "the Official Finnish Singles Chart") represents physical and digital track sales as well as music streaming, and the one on the right side (Suomen virallinen radiosoittolista, "the Official Finnish Airplay Chart") represents airplay.

Chart history

See also
List of number-one albums of 2018 (Finland)

References

Number-one singles
Finland Singles
2018